From March 14 to June 11, 1944, voters of the Republican Party selected delegates to the 1944 Republican National Convention for the purpose of selecting their nominee for president in the 1944 election at the 1944 Republican National Convention held from June 26 to June 28, 1944, in Chicago, Illinois.

Although the result of the elections were inconclusive, maneuvering by the delegates secured the nomination for Governor of New York Thomas E. Dewey before they convened in Chicago. Dewey easily overcame a challenge from Governor of Ohio John W. Bricker and was nominated on the first ballot. In a bid to maintain party unity, Dewey, a moderate, chose the conservative Bricker as his running mate; Bricker was nominated by acclamation.

Background

1940 presidential election

In 1940, the Republican nomination was won by Wendell Willkie over Thomas E. Dewey and Robert A. Taft. Willkie owed his nomination to late momentum, at least in part a result of his avowed internationalism; while Dewey and Taft had taken competing stances as isolationists, their popularity declined in response to the growing anxiety over World War II following the fall of France. Dewey, the 38-year old Manhattan district attorney, was particularly damaged by perception that he lacked the experience necessary to manage increasingly bellicose foreign powers.

Following his loss to incumbent President Franklin D. Roosevelt, Willkie retained a public profile. As the United States entered the war, he took an aggressive stance in favor of Roosevelt's diplomatic and military policies, unlike most of his party.

1942 midterms
In the 1942 midterm elections, Republicans ended the Democratic supermajority in the United States Senate. Dewey ascended to leadership of the moderate Eastern wing of the party after his election as Governor of New York, one of the country's most powerful offices.

1943: Willkie declines
As the American war effort progressed, the Republican Party struggled to find common ground on the divisive issue of foreign policy. Wendell Willkie had no such hesitation, publishing his views in the April 1943 book One World, an account of his trip abroad serving as a representative for President Roosevelt. The book alienated Republican nationalists, given Willkie's avowed Wilsonian idealism, and Western foreign policy professionals of all stripes, given his calls to abolish empire and defense of Joseph Stalin. The book was the third non-fiction to sell one million copies since 1900, but his tone and ongoing efforts to ally with the White House alienated Willkie from his adopted party and many of his former supporters. One such alienated supporter was Harold Stassen, whose backing had been crucial to Willkie's nomination in 1940; Stassen now began to consider a campaign of his own. A poll of delegates to the 1940 convention marked Willkie as the weakest possible candidate for 1944; the delegates now favored Dewey, followed by Ohio Governor John W. Bricker. Dewey also led public polling over Willkie.

Members of the party made plans to prevent Willkie from winning the party's nomination in the 1944 election. Clarence Budington Kelland, a member of the Republican National Committee, wrote in a letter to Landon that Harrison E. Spangler, the chair of the party, was attempting to find ten to twelve men to serve as new national figures of the party. Landon and House Minority Leader Joseph W. Martin Jr. worked on stopping Willkie and finding a replacement nominee.

As 1944 began, the frontrunners for the Republican nomination appeared to be Willkie, Taft, and Dewey again. They were joined by General Douglas MacArthur, serving as Allied commander of the Pacific theater, and former Governor of Minnesota Harold Stassen, also serving the war effort in the Pacific as a naval officer. However, Taft surprised many by announcing he was not a candidate and instead backing Governor John W. Bricker, a fellow conservative Ohioan. With Taft out of the race, conservatives were divided between Bricker and General MacArthur. However, the campaign for MacArthur was limited by the General's inability to participate.

Candidates

Major candidates
These candidates participated in multiple state primaries or were included in multiple major national polls.

Competing in primaries

Bypassing primaries
The following candidates did not actively campaign for any state's presidential primary (other than their own), but may have had their name placed on the ballot by supporters or may have sought to influence to selection of un-elected delegates or sought the support of uncommitted delegates.

Favorite sons 
The following candidates ran only in their home state's primary or caucus for the purpose of controlling its delegate slate at the convention and did not appear to be considered national candidates by the media.

 State Director of Taxation Joseph H. Bottum of South Dakota
 Representative Charles A. Christopherson of South Dakota
 Senator Chapman Revercomb of West Virginia
 Governor Leverett Saltonstall of Massachusetts
 Governor Simeon S. Willis of Kentucky
 Governor Dwight Griswold of Nebraska

Declined to run 
 Senator Robert Taft of Ohio
 Senator Arthur Vandenberg of Michigan

Polling

National polling

Statewide contest by winner
Willkie withdrew from the presidential campaign following his poor results in the Wisconsin primary.

The convention

See also
1944 Democratic Party presidential primaries

References

Bibliography